Iceland competed at the 2014 Summer Youth Olympics, in Nanjing, China from 16 August to 28 August 2014.

Football

Iceland will compete in the boys' tournament.

Boys' Tournament

Roster

 Aron Adalsteinsson
 Atli Hrafn Andrason
 Sigurbergur Bjarnason
 Solvi Bjornsson
 Kolbeinn Finnsson
 Helgi Gudjonsson
 Torfi Gunnarsson
 Alex Þór Hauksson
 Jonatan Jonsson
 Kristófer Kristinsson
 Gísli Þorgeir Kristjánsson
 Isak Kristjansson
 Karl Magnusson
 Hilmar McShane
 Kristinn Petursson
 Aron Stefansson
 Oliver Thorlacius
 Gudmundur Tryggvason

Group Stage

Semi-final

Bronze medal match

Swimming

Iceland qualified two swimmers.

Boys

Girls

References

2014 in Icelandic sport
Nations at the 2014 Summer Youth Olympics
Iceland at the Youth Olympics